Tufeld is a surname. Notable people with the surname include:

Bruce Tufeld (1952–2019), American talent agent and manager
Dick Tufeld (1926–2012), American actor